The R405 road is a regional road in Ireland, located in County Dublin and County Kildare.

References

Regional roads in the Republic of Ireland
Roads in County Dublin
Roads in County Kildare